"Like a Love?" is the eighth single released by Japanese singer Ami Suzuki under label Avex Trax. It was released in July 2006.

Information
On June 28, 2006, it was announced that "Like a Love?" would be composed by Ai Otsuka, a popular J-pop singer. This will be the first time Otsuka has composed for any other artist besides herself.

Despite having Otsuka on board as the composer, the single flopped on the charts due to lack of promotion and very few televised performances.

Track listing

Live performances
23 July 2006 – Music Express
28 July 2006 – Music Fighter
8 August 2006 - Pop Jam Deluxe Natsu Uta '06
10 August 2006 - Utaban

Charts
Oricon Sales Chart (Japan)

Ami Suzuki songs
2006 singles
2006 songs
Songs written by Ami Suzuki
Song recordings produced by Max Matsuura
Avex Trax singles